The Custer Channel Wing was a series of American-built experimental aircraft designs of the 1940s and 1950s incorporating a half-barrel shaped section to each wing.

The channel wing principle

In 1925, Willard Custer noticed how very strong winds had managed to lift the roof of a barn. He realized that the high velocity of the wind created a lower pressure above the roof while the pressure remained high inside, literally lifting the roof off. This low pressure above/high pressure below is the same phenomenon that allows an airplane wing to provide lift.

Custer developed a wing design incorporating a semi-circular channel or "half barrel" shape in which an engine was to be fitted, in order to draw air over the wing and, in 1929, he received a United States patent.

The arrangement is intended to draw enough air over the wing, even when moving slowly, to create sufficient lift to fly. Custer claimed that this layout, the channel wing, gave STOL operating capabilities and resulted in a design "which is an aircraft not an airplane. It does not plane the air to fly, rather it brings the air to the lift surfaces and reduces pressure to fly at 8 to 11 mph."

CCW-1

The first aircraft to incorporate Custer's concept was the CCW-1 which was fitted with a single-seat and was powered by two  Lycoming O-145 pusher engines.  Registered NX30090 in the FAAs experimental category, the sole example first flew on  during a solo flight that was quite unintentional. Custer, who was a non-pilot, taxied the aircraft in a demonstration for financial backers and it suddenly became airborne. A hard landing followed, and one landing gear collapsed, but this did not dampen his backers' enthusiasm.

The prototype was test flown by Frank D. Kelley, who would become a partner in the National Aircraft Corporation with Custer. The Channelwing concept was demonstrated with scale wind tunnel tests for the United States Army Air Forces in Dayton in June 1944, and again, in 1946, with 53 different configurations.

NX30090 was donated to the National Air and Space Museum and displayed at Silver Hill, Maryland.

CCW-2
This was an evolution of the CCW-1 as a single-seat test bed and used an adapted uncovered fuselage of a Taylorcraft BC-12 light aircraft, replacing the single engine with two pusher engines fitted each side of the fuselage and placed within the wing channels. It was flown for about 100 hours of testing with take-off and landing being made within . Despite the claim of "flying better than a conventional aircraft," it was calculated that a stock Piper Cub was more efficient, lifting  versus the CCW-2's . The CCW-3 and CCW-4 designations were not used.

The Custer Channel Wing Corporation
In 1951, Custer formed the Custer Channel Wing Corporation with a registered address at 1905 West Washington Street, Hagerstown, Maryland. 

Taylorcraft Inc of Conway, Pennsylvania were the first manufacturers to be licensed for the production of both military and private aircraft using the Channel Wing principles. The first type intended to be produced was an experimental military aircraft to comply with United States Air Force specifications for a liaison aircraft. It was to carry a pilot and three fully equipped combat troops or 10 litter patients. Taylorcraft never put the plans into action. A design had been prepared by early 1952 for a single-engined channel wing aircraft with the engine fitted in a single channel immediately behind the crew cabin, but this aircraft was not built. Design numbers CCW-3 and CCW-4 were not used. 

The suit was dismissed.

CCW-5

Custer's Corporation went on to develop and build the five-seat CCW-5, intended for commercial sale. The first example N6257C was designed by Custer but built by the Baumann Corporation of Santa Barbara, California. It utilized an adapted fuselage and tail assembly of a Baumann Brigadier. Power was from two pusher 225 h.p. Continental O-470 engines.

The second example N5855V was manufactured at the Custer factory. It again used a Baumann Brigadier fuselage and tail assembly. Although several firms expressed interest in production of the design, all failed to provide the necessary downpayment.

The CCW-5 accommodated five persons, and its power plants are suspended in the center of the -chord wing channels on tubular frameworks attached to the wing spars. The aircraft draws air through the channels at high velocity, decreasing pressure over the wings and increasing lift.

The CCW-5 continued to make developmental flights during the 1960s and 1970s, but no production orders were obtained.

N5855V was donated to the Mid-Atlantic Air Museum at Reading Airport, Pennsylvania and is on restricted display.

References

External links

Aerofiles.com: Data and photographs of the CCW series
 Information and photographs of the preserved CCW-5
Custer Channel Wing on Internet Archive

1950s United States civil utility aircraft
1950s United States experimental aircraft
Aircraft first flown in 1953
Aviation in Maryland
Channel-wing aircraft
Custer aircraft
Defunct aircraft manufacturers of the United States